Juho is a male given name. It is an Estonian and Finnish variation of John. The name day for Juho in Finland is on June 24. Close variations of Juho are Johannes, Juhan, Juhana, Juhani, Juha, Jussi, Jukka, Jani and Janne (all sharing the same name day).

Between 2000 and 2006, 4,939 boys were given the name Juho in Finland.

People with the given name Juho
Juho Alasuutari (born 1990), Finnish footballer
Juho Annala (born 1984), Finnish race car driver
Juho Erkki Antila (1856–1920), Finnish politician 
Juho Astala (1860–1936), Finnish politician
Juho Eerola (born 1975), Finnish politician 
Juho Hakkinen (1872–1918), Finnish politician
Juho Halme (1888–1918), Finnish track and field athlete and Olympic competitor
Juho Hänninen (born 1981), Finnish rally driver
Juho Haveri (1876–1961), Finnish politician
Juho Heikkinen (1863–1938), Finnish politician
Juho Heiskanen (1889–1950), Finnish military Major General during World War II
Juho August Hollo (1885–1967), Finnish translator and academic 
Juho Hyvönen (1891–1975), Finnish politician
Juho Jaakonaho (1882– 1964), Finnish road racing cyclist and Olympic competitor 
Juho Jokinen (born 1986), Finnish ice hockey player
Juho Kanniainen (1875–1929), Finnish politician
Juho Karvonen (1888–1966), Finnish politician
Juho Kauppinen (born 1986), Finnish musician (Korpiklaani)
Juho Kekkonen (1890–1951), Finnish politician
Juho Keränen (born 1985), Finnish ice hockey player
Juho Koivisto (1885–1975), Finnish politician
Juho Kokko (1865–1939), Finnish politician
Juho Kuosmanen (born 1979), Finnish film director
Juho Laakso (1854–1915), Finnish politician
Juho Lähde (born 1991), Finnish footballer
Juho Lallukka (1852–1913), Finnish businessman and a patron of the arts
Juho Lammikko (born 1996), Finnish ice hockey player
Juho Lehmus (1858–1918), Finnish politician
Juho Lepistö (1861–1941), Finnish politician
Juho Mäkelä (born 1983), Finnish footballer
Juho Malkamäki (1844–1928), Finnish politician
Juho Matsalu (1911–1987), Estonian footballer
Juho Mielonen (born 1987), Finnish ice hockey player
Juho Mikkonen (born 1990), Finnish cross-country skier and Olympic competitor
Juho Niukkanen (1888–1954), Finnish politician 
Juho Nykänen (born 1985), Finnish footballer
Juho Kusti Paasikivi (1870–1956), Prime Minister of Finland in three cabinets and President of Finland
Juho Paksujalka (1883–1951), Finnish politician
Juho Paukku (born 1986), Finnish tennis player
Juho Aarne Pekkalainen (1895–1958), Finnish sailor and Olympic medalist
Juho Perälä (1887–1938), Finnish politician
Juho Peura (1879–1918), Finnish politician
Juho Rikkonen (1874–1918), Finnish politician
Juho Julius Saaristo (1891–1969), Finnish track and field athlete and Olympic medalist
Kaarlo Juho Ståhlberg (1865–1952), first President of Finland
Juho Sunila (1875–1936), Prime Minister of Finland in two cabinets
Juho Vennola (1872–1938), Prime Minister of Finland in two cabinets

References

Estonian masculine given names
Finnish masculine given names